The Israel women's national handball team represents Israel in international team handball competitions. It has yet to participate in a European or World championship.

External links
Official website
IHF profile

National team
Handball
Women's national handball teams